The Beijing–Hong Kong (Taipei) corridor is a proposed high-speed railway corridor in Greater China. It will run in a north–south direction from Beijing to Hong Kong, with a branch leading from Hefei to end at Taipei across the Taiwan Strait. It will connect the cities of Beijing, Xiong'an, Fuyang, Hefei, Jiujiang, Nanchang, Ganzhou, Shenzhen and Hong Kong on the main line, as well as Fuzhou and Taipei, Taiwan on the branch line.

The line was announced by the Chinese government in 2016 as part of the national "eight vertical and eight horizontal" high-speed railway network. Currently, high-speed services from Beijing to Hong Kong travel via the Beijing–Guangzhou high-speed railway. This corridor will create a more direct route.

Route

References

See also 
 High-speed rail in China

High-speed rail in China